National Road 40, is a Swedish national road in southern Sweden, between Gothenburg and Västervik. The length of the road is 321 km. The stretch Gothenburg–Jönköping is a part of the fastest and most used route when driving between Gothenburg and Stockholm. The road is a motorway along 96 km between Gothenburg and Ulricehamn. It is a 2+1-road with a middle barrier along 84 km between Ulricehamn and Nässjö.

National road 40